Caloptilia isochrysa is a moth of the family Gracillariidae. It is known from the state of Meghalaya in India, the islands of Honshū, Kyūshū and Ryukyu in Japan and from Nepal.

The wingspan is 14–15 mm.

The larvae feed on Cleyeria japonica. They probably mine the leaves of their host plant.

References

isochrysa
Moths of Asia
Moths described in 1908